Toivo Henrik Rintala (24 October 1876, Sysmä – 16 December 1953) was a Finnish consumers' co-operative manager and politician. He served as a Member of the Parliament of Finland from 1919 to 1922, representing the Social Democratic Party of Finland (SDP).

References

1876 births
1953 deaths
People from Sysmä
People from Mikkeli Province (Grand Duchy of Finland)
Social Democratic Party of Finland politicians
Members of the Parliament of Finland (1919–22)